A Lass of the Lumberlands is a 1916 silent film serial directed by Paul Hurst and J. P. McGowan, and starring Helen Holmes. The serial is considered to be lost.

Cast
 Helen Holmes - Helen Holmes / Helen Dawson  
 Leo D. Maloney - Tom Dawson 
 Thomas G. Lingham - Dollar Holmes
 William N. Chapman 
 Paul Hurst 
 Katherine Goodrich
 Frank Hemphill
 William Behrens

Chapter titles
 The Lumber Pirates
 The Wreck in the Fog
 First Blood
 A Deed of Daring
 The Burned Record
 The Spiked Switch
 The Runaway Car
 The Fight in Camp I
 The Double Fight
 The Gold Rush
 The Ace High Loses
 The Main Line Wreck
 (Title Unknown)
 The Indian's Head
 Retribution

Locations

See also
 List of lost films

References

External links

 

1916 films
American silent serial films
American black-and-white films
Lost Western (genre) films
1916 Western (genre) films
Lost American films
1916 lost films
Silent American Western (genre) films
Films directed by J. P. McGowan
Films directed by Paul Hurst
1910s American films